Andrea Panizza (born 14 July 1998) is an Italian rower. He competed at the 2020 Summer Olympics, in Quadruple sculls.

He participated at the 2018 World Rowing Championships where he became world champion in quad scull.

References

External links

1998 births
Living people
Italian male rowers
Sportspeople from Lecco
World Rowing Championships medalists for Italy
European Rowing Championships medalists
Athletics competitors of Fiamme Gialle
Rowers of Fiamme Gialle
Rowers at the 2020 Summer Olympics
Olympic rowers of Italy
21st-century Italian people